Dialogue (stylized as DIALOGUE+) is a Japanese idol group which is signed to Pony Canyon. The group, consisting of eight voice actresses, debuted in 2019 with the release of their first single "Hajimete no Kakumei", the title track of which was used as the opening theme of the anime television series High School Prodigies Have It Easy Even In Another World. Their music has also been used in Bottom-tier Character Tomozaki and  Higehiro.

History
Dialogue began its activities in 2019. It is composed of eight members: Yurina Uchiyama, Nene Hieda, Kyōka Moriya,  Yūna Ogata, Ayaka Takamura, Satsuki Miyahara, Mayu Iizuka, and Manatsu Murakami, all of whom were also cast in the mobile game CUE!. The group's first single,  was released on October 23, 2019; the title song, which was written and composed by Unison Square Garden member Tomoya Tabuchi and arranged by Hidekazu Tanaka, was used as the opening theme of the anime television series High School Prodigies Have It Easy Even In Another World. They then released the mini-album Dreamy-Logue on April 8, 2020. They also performed the opening theme of the anime series Higehiro and My Stepmom's Daughter Is My Ex. They also performed the ending theme of the anime series Skeleton Knight in Another World and Love After World Domination.

Their first album, DIALOGUE+1, was released on September 1, 2021. Their second album, DIALOGUE+2,  was released on February 22, 2023.

Members

Discography

Studio albums

Mini-albums

Singles

References

External links
Official website 
DIALOGUE＋ on Twitter 

Anime musical groups
Japanese idol groups
Japanese pop music groups
Musical groups established in 2019
Pony Canyon artists
2019 establishments in Japan